Willis Chatman Hawley (May 5, 1864 – July 24, 1941) was an American politician and educator in the state of Oregon. A native of the state, he would serve as president of Willamette University in Salem, Oregon, where he earned his undergraduate and law degrees before entering politics. A Republican, he served as a member of the United States House of Representatives from Oregon from 1907 to 1933 where he co-sponsored the Smoot–Hawley Tariff Act in 1930.

Early life
Hawley was born on a farm in the old Belknap settlement near Monroe in Benton County, Oregon, on May 5, 1864. After he attended country schools, he entered college. In 1884, he graduated with a bachelor of science degree from Willamette University in Salem, Oregon. Hawley was the principal of the Umpqua Academy from 1884–86. In 1888, he received a bachelor of arts degree from the school along with a Bachelor of Laws from the law department.

Next, he served as president of the Oregon State Normal School at Drain south of Eugene from 1888–1891. During this time he earned a master's degree from Willamette in 1890 and the following year joined the faculty at his alma mater. Hawley became the president of Willamette, serving in that position from 1893 to 1902 while he was professor of history and economics for sixteen years at the school.

Then, he engaged in a variety of business and educational ventures before entering politics. Hawley became a member of the National Forest Reservation Commission and a member of the Special Committee on Rural Credits created by Congress in 1915. Additionally, he served as a member of the Commission for the Celebration of the Two Hundredth Anniversary of the Birth of president and general George Washington.

Politics
Hawley won Oregon's 1st Congressional District as a Republican in 1906. He was then re-elected every two years to Congress for the next 12 sessions of Congress. Hawley served in Washington, D.C., from March 4, 1907, until March 3, 1933.  While in Congress, he was chairman of the Committee on Ways and Means for the Seventieth and Seventy-first Congresses. Hawley was then a co-sponsor of the Smoot–Hawley Tariff in 1930, which raised import tariffs to record levels.

Hawley was defeated in his bid for renomination to his House seat in 1932, and left office in March 1933. He returned to Salem where he practiced law. He died on July 24, 1941, at the age of 77 in Salem and was interred at that city's City View Cemetery.

References

External links

 http://www.oregonencyclopedia.org/articles/hawley_willis/

1864 births
1941 deaths
Oregon lawyers
People from Monroe, Oregon
Willamette University College of Law alumni
Presidents of Willamette University
Willamette University alumni
Republican Party members of the United States House of Representatives from Oregon
Burials at City View Cemetery